= Bulbouncinula =

Scientific classification
- Kingdom: Fungi
- Division: Ascomycota
- Class: Leotiomycetes
- Order: Helotiales
- Family: Erysiphaceae
- Genus: Bulbouncinula; R.Y. Zheng & G.Q. Chen

Genus of fungi

Bulbouncinula is a genus of fungi in the family Erysiphaceae.
